Anthonij Johannes Guépin (2 May 1897 – 16 August 1964) was a sailor from the Netherlands, who represented his native country at the 1924 Summer Olympics in Paris, France. With helmsman Joop Carp and fellow crew member Jan Vreede, crewing the Dutch boat Willem Six, Guépin took the Bronze in the 6 Metre.

Professional life
Anthony Guépin followed Gymnasium and studied law at the Leiden University He became a top manager within Koninklijke Philips N.V. due to his people skills tact and diplomacy.

Guépin started his career by Philips on 15 May 1925 as lawyer in Amsterdam. He was promoted on 19 juni 1939 to secretary of the company and was in charge of the patent department. In 1958 he became vice president.

Even after his retirement Guépin stayed involved by Phillips as member of the board.

References

Sources

External links
 
 

1897 births
1964 deaths
Dutch male sailors (sport)
Olympic sailors of the Netherlands
Sailors at the 1924 Summer Olympics – 6 Metre
Olympic bronze medalists for the Netherlands
People from Den Helder
Olympic medalists in sailing
Medalists at the 1924 Summer Olympics
Sportspeople from North Holland